Darwinia macrostegia, commonly known as Mondurup bell, is a species of flowering plant in the family Myrtaceae and is endemic to the south-west of Western Australia. It is a straggly shrub with elliptic leaves and clusters of pendent flowers surrounded by red and white bracts.

Description
Flowering mainly occurs from August to November.

Taxonomy and naming
The species was first formally described in 1849 by Nikolai Turczaninow who gave it the name Genetyllis macrostegia and published the description in Bulletin de la Société Impériale des Naturalistes de Moscou. In 1865, George Bentham changed the name to Darwinia macrostegia in The Journal of the Linnean Society, Botany. The specific epithet (macrostegia) means "large roof" or "tent", referring to the floral bracts.

A 1951 newspaper article about "Mondurup", a "long mountain that dominates the western end of the range", described this plant as "The Climber's Badge".

Distribution and habitat
Mondurup bell occurs in and near the Stirling Range National Park in five separate populations, and grows in stony soils on rocky hillsides and in gullies in the Esperance Plains and Jarrah Forest bioregions of south-western Western Australia.

Conservation status
Darwinia macrostegia is listed as "Priority Four" by the Government of Western Australia Department of Biodiversity, Conservation and Attractions, meaning that it is rare or near threatened.

References

macrostegia
Endemic flora of Western Australia
Myrtales of Australia
Rosids of Western Australia
Plants described in 1849
Taxa named by Nikolai Turczaninow